The 2003 Kentucky gubernatorial election was held to elect the Governor of Kentucky on November 4, 2003. Republican candidate Ernie Fletcher defeated Democrat Ben Chandler and became the first Republican governor of Kentucky in 32 years.

Democratic primary

Candidates

Declared
Ben Chandler - Kentucky Attorney General, 1995-present; former Kentucky Auditor of Public Accounts, 1991-1995.
Running mate: Charlie Owen, Louisville entrepreneur; former head of the Kentucky Crime Commission, 1969-1973; candidate in 1998 U.S. Senate race in Kentucky who received 29% of the vote in the primary. 

Jody Richards – State Representative, 1975–present (Speaker of the House, 1996–present).
Running mate: Tony Miller, Jefferson County Circuit Court Clerk, 1988-present.

Otis Hensley – Private contractor from Wallins Creek, Kentucky.
Running mate: Richard Robbins

Withdrawn
Bruce Lunsford – prominent Louisville businessman; former Kentucky Secretary of Commerce, 1981-1983
Running mate: Barbara Edelman, litigation lawyer; former Assistant Kentucky Attorney General, 1977-1979; former Assistant U.S. Attorney for Eastern District of Kentucky

Campaign
Incumbent Democratic Governor Paul E. Patton was term limited from seeking a third term of office and was facing investigations after admitting to an affair. This led to the other Democratic candidates distancing themselves from him.  State Attorney General Ben Chandler won the primary narrowly defeating the Speaker of the Kentucky House of Representatives Jody Richards, whose running mate was Tony Miller. He had led in the polls for several months before the primary.

Earlier businessman Bruce Lunsford had dropped out of the primary after Chandler launched adverts talking of abuse at nursing homes run by Lunsford's company. Lunsford had spent 8 million dollars of his own money during the primary campaign and after his withdrawal backed Richards against Chandler and said he would vote against Chandler in the general election if he won the primary.

Results

Republican primary

Candidates

Declared
Ernie Fletcher - U.S. Representative for Kentucky's 6th congressional district, 1999-present; former State Representative, 1995–1997.
Running mate: Steve Pence, former U.S. Attorney for Western District of Kentucky, 2001-2003; previously former Assistant U.S. Attorney for Western District of Kentucky, 1990-1995
Former running mate: G. Hunter Bates, former Chief of Staff to Mitch McConnell, 2000-2002, McConnell's campaign manager in 2002 Senate race, removed from ballot after primary due to not meeting constitutional residency requirements 
Rebecca Jackson - former Jefferson County Judge/Executive, 1998-2002
Running mate: Robbie Rudolph, Murray businessman; founder and owner of Rudolph Tire Inc. (later served on Fletcher's transition team, appointed Secretary of Finance, later State Secretary of Executive Cabinet in 2006, and eventually became Fletcher's running mate in 2007)
Steve Nunn - son of former governor Louie B. Nunn; State Representative, 1990–present
Running mate: Bob Heleringer, former State Representative, 1980–2002
Virgil Moore - State Senator, 1992-present
Running mate: Don Bell, retired United States Secret Service agent

Campaign
Physician and former Air Force pilot Ernie Fletcher won the Republican primary easily. Earlier Fletcher had to replace his running mate for lieutenant governor, Hunter Bates, as he did not meet the residency requirements. Fletcher was backed by U.S. Senator Mitch McConnell and led in most polls before the primary.

Results

General election

Campaign
Fletcher tried to link Chandler with the scandals that incumbent governor Patton's administration had been racked with. However Chandler attempted to distance himself from the governor, calling for him to resign and describing himself as a maverick.

Chandler meanwhile attacked President George Bush for his handling of the economy and linked Fletcher with his policies. Nevertheless, Fletcher was assisted late in the campaign by President Bush, who made five visits to Kentucky to support him. Fletcher led in the polls throughout the campaign and towards the end pulled out a lead of 7 to 9 percent over Chandler.

Just before the election the American Civil Liberties Union (ACLU) filed lawsuits for some residents of largely Democratic districts in West Louisville to try to get an injunction to stop Republicans from putting challengers in their precincts. Kentucky law allowed challengers to be stationed in precincts to question whether voters were eligible but the ACLU claimed they were targeting black voters and could intimidate people. However a judge refused to issue the injunction and allowed the challengers to go ahead.

Exit polls showed that Fletcher got a quarter of Democrats to support him as well as a majority of independents. Male voters backed Fletcher over Chandler by 59% to 41%, while women split almost equally. They also showed that 18% of voters used their votes to express opposition to the incumbent governor Paul Patton.

Polling

Results

Notes

References

Gubernatorial
Kentucky
2003